Miguel Ángel Rubio can refer to:

 Miguel Ángel Rubio (footballer)
 Miguel Ángel Rubio (gymnast)